William Gyves (born July 1867) was an English footballer. Born in Manchester, he played as a goalkeeper for Newton Heath LYR. He made his debut in an FA Cup second qualifying round match against Bootle on 25 October 1890; the first team had agreed to play in a friendly against Darwen the same day, so both sides agreed to use their reserve teams. Later in the season, he made another first-team appearance in the third round of the Manchester Senior Cup, a 2–2 draw at home to Hurst on 14 February 1891.

References

External links
Profile at StretfordEnd.co.uk
Profile at MUFCinfo.com

1867 births
Year of death missing
Footballers from Manchester
English footballers
Association football goalkeepers
Manchester United F.C. players